James Donald Haslett (born December 9, 1955) is an American football coach and former linebacker who is the head coach of the Seattle Sea Dragons of the XFL. He played college football for the IUP Crimson Hawks before being drafted by the Buffalo Bills in the second round of the 1979 NFL Draft; he went on to be named NFL Defensive Rookie of the Year.

Haslett's coaching career began in the late 1980s, with him rejoining the NFL by the mid 1990s. In 2000, he was hired as head coach of the New Orleans Saints and was named the NFL Coach of the Year. He has also served as head coach for the Florida Tuskers of the United Football League (UFL).

Playing career
Haslett attended Indiana University of Pennsylvania, and was selected in the second round of the 1979 NFL Draft by the Buffalo Bills. He was a linebacker for the Buffalo Bills through 1985; he broke his leg during a 1986 preseason contest, ending his time with the Bills. He made a brief comeback with the New York Jets in 1987. He was named the NFL Defensive Rookie of the Year for 1979. In a 2005 article in the Pittsburgh Post-Gazette, Haslett admitted to using steroids while playing for the Buffalo Bills. Haslett went on record saying that "everybody tried it" to gain a competitive advantage against opposing teams.

Coaching career

University at Buffalo

Haslett's first coaching position was as an assistant coach at the University at Buffalo from 1988 to 1990. He is the second assistant coach of the University of Buffalo Bulls to move and become a head coach in the NFL. The first was Buddy Ryan.

NFL assistant coaching positions
Haslett began his NFL coaching career as a linebackers coach for the Los Angeles Raiders in 1993.  Haslett next coached linebackers for the New Orleans Saints in 1995 and was promoted to defensive coordinator for the 1996 season.  Haslett then coordinated the Pittsburgh Steelers defense for the 1997 through 1999 seasons.

New Orleans Saints
In January 2000, Haslett was named head coach of the New Orleans Saints. That season, he guided the Saints to a 10–6 regular-season record, their second NFC West division championship, and the first playoff victory in franchise history (defeating the St. Louis Rams; they lost to the Minnesota Vikings the next week). As a result of the Saints' turnaround from their previous 3–13 season (under his predecessor, Mike Ditka), Haslett was named NFL Coach of the Year. This was the only playoff appearance in Haslett's six years in New Orleans. They would only notch one other winning record in 2002. That year, the Saints started 9-4, but three consecutive losses, including to the 1-14 Cincinnati Bengals, resulted in them missing the playoffs by a single game.

In 2005, the Saints crashed to a 3–13 record.  The season was marred by Hurricane Katrina's devastation of New Orleans. This forced the franchise to temporarily relocate to San Antonio, playing three of their 'home' games in the Alamodome.  Another four home games were played in Baton Rouge at LSU's Tiger Stadium, and one took place at Giants Stadium in New Jersey (against the New York Giants). Haslett was fired after the close of the 2005 season and replaced by Sean Payton.

St. Louis Rams
Haslett became the St. Louis Rams' defensive coordinator to start the 2006 season. On September 29, 2008 Haslett was named the interim head coach of the Rams after Scott Linehan was fired. The Rams gave Haslett an interim coach's contract, containing a clause that promised him the permanent head coach's job if the team won at least six games that season.  Within a few weeks, this clause was nullified by the NFL, because it violated the league's "Rooney Rule". He won his first game as interim head coach of the Rams with a 19-17 victory over the 4-1 Washington Redskins. That win was followed by a 34-14 drubbing of the Dallas Cowboys on October 19, 2008. This brought the Rams to a 2-4 record.  The team would lose their final 10 games, leaving Haslett with an interim record of 2-10 on the year. On January 15, 2009, the Rams announced that Haslett was no longer in consideration for the permanent head coaching position and that the team would be going in a "new direction".

Florida Tuskers
Haslett coached the Florida Tuskers of the United Football League during its inaugural season in 2009. The team went 6-0 but were upset in the first-ever UFL Championship Game by the Las Vegas Locomotives. He won UFL Coach of Year in their inaugural season.

Washington Redskins
Haslett was hired as the Washington Redskins defensive coordinator on January 12, 2010 under head coach Mike Shanahan. Haslett replaced the retiring Greg Blache. After many speculated he would be fired after the disastrous 2013 season, new head coach Jay Gruden announced Haslett would remain on the team for the upcoming 2014 season.  On December 31, 2014, the Redskins announced that Haslett would leave the Redskins by mutual agreement.

Cincinnati Bengals
On January 15, 2016, he was hired as linebackers coach for the Cincinnati Bengals. Following the 2018 NFL season, the Bengals fired Haslett along with head coach Marvin Lewis.

Tennessee Titans
On February 6, 2020, Tennessee Titans head coach Mike Vrabel hired Haslett as the team's Inside linebackers coach. He was not retained after the 2021 season.

XFL 
Haslett was announced as an XFL head coach in 2021, later revealed to be for the Seattle Sea Dragons.

Head coaching record

*Interim head coach

XFL

References

1955 births
Living people
American football linebackers
Buffalo Bills players
Buffalo Bulls football coaches
Cincinnati Bengals coaches
College Football Hall of Fame inductees
Florida Tuskers coaches
IUP Crimson Hawks football players
Los Angeles Raiders coaches
National Football League defensive coordinators
National Football League Defensive Rookie of the Year Award winners
National Football League replacement players
New Orleans Saints coaches
New Orleans Saints head coaches
New York Jets players
Penn State Nittany Lions football coaches
Pittsburgh Steelers coaches
Players of American football from Pittsburgh
Sacramento Surge coaches
Sportspeople from Pittsburgh
St. Louis Rams coaches
St. Louis Rams head coaches
Tennessee Titans coaches
United Football League (2009–2012) head coaches
Washington Redskins coaches